AKT-interacting protein is a protein that in humans is encoded by the AKTIP gene.

The mouse homolog of this gene produces fused toes and thymic hyperplasia in heterozygous mutant animals while homozygous mutants die in early development. This gene may play a role in apoptosis as these morphological abnormalities are caused by altered patterns of programmed cell death. The protein encoded by this gene is similar to the ubiquitin ligase domain of other ubiquitin-conjugating enzymes but lacks the conserved cysteine residue that enables those enzymes to conjugate ubiquitin to the target protein. This protein interacts directly with serine/threonine kinase protein kinase B (PKB)/Akt and modulates PKB activity by enhancing the phosphorylation of PKB's regulatory sites. Alternative splicing results in two transcript variants encoding the same protein.

Interactions
AKTIP has been shown to interact with AKT1.

Molecular genetics 

The association between the AKTIP gene variants in a sample of 273 bipolar patients using 3 single-nucleotide polymorphisms has been investigated. No association between suicidal behavior and AKTIP variants nor any interaction between AKTIP and AKT1 polymorphisms was observed.

References

External links

Further reading